The Piccio family is a family of Portuguese Jewish origin. It has established branches in Italy, the Philippines and Turkey. Members also reside in fewer numbers in other countries.

Members
Notable members include:
Azaria Piccio, Venetian rabbi;
Carlo Piccio, Philippine swimmer;
Gino Piccio, Italian priest;
Giuseppe Piccio, Italian literary critic;
Mosè Piccio, Ottoman rabbi and lexicographer;
Mordekay Piccio, Israeli paramilitary;
Pier Ruggero Piccio, Italian World War I general and founding Chief of Staff of the Italian Air Force;
Vicente Piccio, Jr., Philippine major general, Air Force Chief, and former Mayor.

References

 
Surnames of Portuguese origin
Italian-language surnames